Beeching is an English surname. Either a derivative of the old English bece, bæce "stream", hence "dweller by the stream" or of the old English bece "beech-tree" hence "dweller by the beech tree".

People called Beeching include:-

 Henry Beeching (1859–1919) clergyman, author and poet
 Jack Beeching (John Charles Stuart Beeching) (1922–2001), British poet
 Richard Beeching (1913–1985), chairman of British Railways
 Thomas Beeching (1900–1971), English soldier and cricketer
 Vicky Beeching (Victoria Louise Beeching) (born 1979), British-born Christian singer

See also
 Beeching Axe, informal name for the report "The Reshaping of British Railways"

References

English-language surnames